The Șaru Dornei mine is a mine located in the north of Romania in Suceava County. Șaru Dornei represents one of the largest manganese reserve in the Romania having estimated reserves of 15 million tonnes of manganese ore grading 26% manganese metal.

References 

Manganese mines in Romania